SS Teiryu Maru was a steam cargo ship that was launched in England in 1914 as Northwestern Miller. Furness, Withy & Co managed her until 1927, when Norddeutscher Lloyd bought her and renamed her Augsburg.

In 1940 the Japanese government bought Augsburg and renamed her Teiryu Maru. In 1944 a US Navy submarine sank her in the South China Sea, killing 149 of her passengers and crew.

Building
The Northumberland Shipbuilding Company built Northwestern Miller at Howdon, Northumberland. She was launched on 19 October 1914 and completed in March 1915. Northumberland SB Co also built her sister ship Southwestern Miller, which was launched on 17 December 1914 and completed in June 1915.

Northwestern Miller had a single screw. It was driven by a three-cylinder triple expansion engine built by Richardsons Westgarth & Company of Hartlepool.

Furness, Withy service
Northwestern Miller and her sister ship were built for Norfolk & North American Steam Shipping Co Ltd, which since 1910 had been a subsidiary of Furness, Withy & Co. They were intended to bring grain from the Pacific coast of North America through the Panama Canal, which opened in August 1914.

Furness, Withy registered Northwestern Miller at Liverpool. She was given the UK official number 137431 and code letters JKGP.

Northwestern Miller survived the First World War. In 1920–21 Furness, Withy ran her in cargo liner service between London and New York.

Norddeutscher Lloyd service
In 1927 Norddeutscher Lloyd bought both Northwestern Miller and Southwestern Miller, and renamed them Augsburg and Giessen respectively. Augsburg was registered in Bremen and given the German code letters QMGN.

NDL ran the two ships between Europe and the Far East. Giessen was wrecked in the East China Sea in 1929.

On 4 December 1932 Augsburg collided with the  tanker Nord Atlantic in fog on the Weser.

In 1934  the new call sign DOEM superseded Augsburgs code letters.

On 24 August 1939 Augsburg reached Dairen in the Japanese-ruled Kwantung Leased Territory. On 3 September the United Kingdom entered the Second World War. Augsburg was laid up in Dairen to avoid the risk of being captured by the Royal Navy Far East Fleet.

On 23 February 1940 NDL sold Augsburg to the Batavier Line, which planned to rename her Vreeburgh. Batavier Line sent a crew from Rotterdam to take her over, but Germany invaded the Netherlands on 10 May, before the Dutch crew could reach Dairen. The sale seems to have fallen through.

Japanese service
On 12 May 1940 the Japanese government bought Augsburg, apparently from NDL rather than Batavier Line. She was renamed Teiryu Maru and registered in Tokyo. On 5 December the government paid NDL $370,000 for her. On 3 February 1941 she was given the call sign JQQO. In 1941 her owner was recorded as Teikoku Kisen KK.

Teiryu Maryu took part in the Japanese invasion of the Philippines in December 1941 and invasion of the Dutch East Indies from January to March 1942. On one voyage in October 1942 she carried 5,693 troops. From November 1942 until May 1943 she supported Japanese forces that were occupying New Britain and invading New Guinea. She operated in the Japanese-occupied Philippines, visited Japanese-occupied Singapore and Malaya and Vichy French Indochina.

On 21 June 1944, she loaded 550 POWs at Cebu arriving at Manila on 24 June. From 15 July 1944 Teiryu Maru was one of eight merchant ships in Convoy Yuta-9 from Sana bound for Takao in Japanese-ruled Taiwan. The  Kuretake and two auxiliary gunboats escorted the convoy.

On the morning of 19 July 1944 the  's radar found Yuta-9 in the South China Sea. At 0745 hrs JST Guardfish hit Teiryu Marus port side with one torpedo, flooding her boiler room. At 0753 hrs Teiryu Maru broke in two and both parts sank. 108 passengers, 38 crew and three defensive gunners were killed.

Yuta-9's escorts counter-attacked with many depth charges, but Guardfish survived.

References

Bibliography

1914 ships
Maritime incidents in 1932
Maritime incidents in July 1944
Ships built on the River Tyne
Ships of Norddeutscher Lloyd
Ships sunk by American submarines
Steamships of Germany
Steamships of Japan
Steamships of the United Kingdom
World War I merchant ships of the United Kingdom
World War II merchant ships of Japan
World War II shipwrecks in the South China Sea
Japanese hell ships